Sangha Tissa II was King of Anuradhapura in the 7th century, whose reign lasted the year 608. He succeeded his brother Aggabodhi II as King of Anuradhapura and was succeeded by Moggallana III.

See also
 List of Sri Lankan monarchs
 History of Sri Lanka

References

External links
 Kings & Rulers of Sri Lanka
 Codrington's Short History of Ceylon

Monarchs of Anuradhapura
S
S
S